Y Trydydd Peth (The Third Thing) is a 2009 Welsh-language novel written by Siân Melangell Dafydd. It concerns 90-year old George Owens, a natural swimmer with a deep love of water stemming from childhood, and a wish to understand the third ingredient that binds hydrogen and oxygen to create water. Learning from an ancient law-book that the river Dee is his by right of birth, he decides to assert his claims by swimming all the way down the river to its estuary at Cheshire.

References

Welsh novels